Skipinnish is a traditional Scottish band from the Gàidhealtachd, singing primarily in English. The band (and brand) Skipinnish was created by Angus MacPhail and Andrew Stevenson in 1999 - both studying at the time at the Royal Scottish Academy of Music and Drama (RSAMD) in Glasgow.

Skipinnish brand
The Skipinnish brand is used in addition to market whisky also in running of a cèilidh house named the  Skipinnish Ceilidh House which has been built in Fort William around the brand. There was previously a Skipinnish Ceilidh House in Oban.

Skipinnish Records
The band runs its own record label which issues acts such as Skerryvore and Gary Innes. Two compilation albums were released of Skipinnish Records artists: The Deluxe Blend of Highland Music: The Best of Skipinnish Records (2006) and Best from Skipinnish Records, Vol. 2.

Members
Current line-up consists of:
Angus MacPhail: Accordion, vocals
Andrew Stevenson: Highland bagpipes, small pipes, whistles, fiddle
Norrie MacIver: Lead singer, guitar
Alasdair Murray: Drums, Highland bagpipes
Alistair Iain Paterson: Piano, keyboards
Rory Grindlay: Drums
Charlotte Printer: Bass guitar

Regular Guest Musicians:
Archie McAllister: Fiddle
Duncan Nicholson: Small pipes, bagpipes, whistles
Kyle Orr: Small pipes, bagpipes, whistles

Earlier members included:
Angus Tikka: Bass guitar
Robert Robertson: Lead singer, guitar, now the lead singer of Tide Lines
Ross Wilson: Keyboard, bass
Jonathan Gillespie: Keyboard, backing vocals

In 2016 Robertson was replaced in Skipinnish by Norrie MacIver as new lead singer. In the same year the band also saw Rory Grindlay join on drums. In the following years Alistair Iain Paterson and Charlotte Printer also joined to form the current band.

Discography

Albums
Skipinnish (2001)
Sgurr Mor to Skerryvore (2003)
Deoch 'N' Dorus (2005)
The Sound of the Summer (2007)
Live From The Ceilidh House (2009)
The Wedding Dance (2010)
Atlantic Roar (2013)
Western Ocean (2014)
The Seventh Wave (2017)
Steer by the Stars (2019)

Singles / videography
"Walking on the Waves" (2014) 
"December" (2014)
"The Island" (2015)
"Home on the Sea" (2016)
"Alive" (2017)
"Wishing Well" (2017)
"Wishing Well" (2018) (re-released as a May 2018 to help with fundraising for a permanent memorial to Eilidh MacLeod from Barra who was killed in the Manchester Arena Bombing)
"Summer Call" (2022)

References

External links
Official website

Scottish folk music groups